Saint Mary's College is a high school located in  Above Rocks in Saint Catherine, Jamaica. It was founded in 1955 by its first principal, Father Edmund Cheney S.J. of  St. Mary's Mission Catholic church.

Currently, about 1000 students are enrolled.
 
Like other Jamaican secondary schools, Saint Mary's College uses a selection process to accept students starting at seventh grade. Students must pass the Grade Six Achievement Test (formerly known as the Common Entrance Examination), and the Grade Nine Achievement Test.

Communities served
The school serves the communities of:
 Golden River
 Parks Roads
 Rock Hall
 Harkers Hall
 Cassava River
 Glengoffe
 Mt. Matthews
 Red Hills
 Zion Hill
 Cavaliers
 Red Ground
 Mannings Hill
 Stony Hill

Until 1966, the school accommodated boarders from other Caribbean countries and the U.S.

Campus
The school has numerous facilities, such as an administrative block, a cafeteria,  lunch room,  library, computer lab,  music room and science labs, as well as several classroom blocks and staff rooms, etc. The school also has spacious volleyball and basketball courts.  The campus has teachers' residences, as well as apartment-style cottages for foreign or out-of-town teachers having the option to live on campus.

Uniform
Uniforms are worn on campus. Girls in first through third form wear a sky blue double pleated tunic over a short-sleeved gold blouse.  Boys wear khaki pants and shirts with blue and gold crest and striped epaulettes.  Girls in fourth and fifth form wear a double pleated blue skirt with a gold blouse and a striped tie, while boys wear khaki pants and shirts with a blue and gold striped tie. Sixth form girls wear a short-sleeved gold jacket lined with blue piping over a blue A-lined skirt.  Sixth form boys wear long-sleeved white shirts, khaki pants and a gold tie striped with blue. All students wear black shoes with navy blue socks. Prefects' uniforms are the same as other students', but they often feature a white short sleeved blouse or shirt instead of the gold blouse or khaki shirt.

Curriculum
Subjects offered to students include Technical Drawing, Wood Works, Mathematics, Physical Education, General Science, Social Studies, Home Economics, Biology, Geography, History, Physics, Food and Nutrition, Clothing and Textiles, Principles of Accounting, Office Administration, Principles of Business, English, Chemistry, Information Technology, Electrical Principles, Literature, Spanish, Art and Religious Education.

Students take the Caribbean Secondary Education Certification (CSEC) Exam in their 4th or 5th year at the school and the Caribbean Advance Proficiency Exam (CAPE) in their 6th form years.

Sports Activities
Students participate in national school events for the following sports:
  Football
 Netball
 Track and Field
 Cricket

Head Teachers/Principals
Fr. Edmund K Cheaney S.J., 1955-1960
Fr. John Meaney, 1960-1964
Fr. Peter Burgess (SMA), 1964-1966
Fr. Maurice Feres S.J., 1966–69
Mr. Carlylse McKenzie, 1969-1974
Mr. Audley Morgan, 1974-1977
Mr. Patrick Donaldson, 1978-1989
Rev. Micah Marrith, 1989-1996
Mrs. Monica Green, 1996-2006
Mrs. Ivy Clarke, 2005-2007
Mrs. Serphena Davidson, 2007-date
Mr. Ryan Williams

References

External links
 St. Mary's College Alumni on the WEB.

High schools in Jamaica
Schools in Jamaica
Buildings and structures in Saint Catherine Parish
Educational institutions established in 1955
1955 establishments in Jamaica